Gerrit Hendrik Kersten (6 August 1882, Deventer – 6 September 1948, Waarde) was a Dutch Calvinist minister and politician. After briefly working as a primary school teacher Kersten was inducted into his first pastorate in Meliskerke in 1905 without formal theological training. In 1907 Kersten was instrumental in achieving a union of two groups of disparate, low-church groups of small secessional congregations, resulting in the formation of the Reformed Congregations (Dutch: Gereformeerde Gemeenten). Eleven years later, in 1918, he established the Reformed Political Party (Dutch: Staatkundig Gereformeerde Partij) to realize his vision of "a Calvinist Netherlands ruled on a biblical basis without cinema, sports, vaccination and social security".  He was the party's first member of the House of Representatives, being elected in 1922. He would remain in parliament until his debarment in 1945.

On the evening of 10 November 1925, Kersten, ever opposed to Catholicism, proposed an amendment to the 1926 budget for the Ministry for Foreign Affairs. Kersten's proposal would result in ending financial support for a Dutch diplomatic office at the Holy See. The amendment was adopted the next day with support from one of the government parties Christian Historical Union, which in turn led to the resignation of four Catholic government ministers and the fall of the first coalition-government of Hendrik Colijn. The fall of the first Colijn cabinet after only three months became known as the Night of Kersten.

Kersten was a staunch critic of the policies of Colijn. The speaker of the Dutch parliament had parts of Kersten's contributions to debates edited in the Proceedings no less than thirteen times between 1922 and 1940. Kersten feared the rise of fascism and Nazism in the inter-war period, but assessed fascism's authoritarian tendencies favourably, seeing socialism and Catholic Christianity as greater evils.

During the Second World War, Kersten denounced resistance against the Nazis, claiming the occupation of The Netherlands was a deserved divine punishment for desecration of the Lord's Day (Sunday). He also refused to sign a 1941 protest of the Convent of Dutch Churches (Dutch: Convent der Kerken) against the persecution of Jews during the war, and even went as far as to cooperate with the Nazis to keep his newspaper, Banier, in business. After the war, a government committee branded him a collaborator and barred him from returning to Parliament. He focused on writing theological works. Kersten died three years later, in 1948.

References 

1882 births
1948 deaths
20th-century Calvinist and Reformed theologians
Christian fundamentalists
20th-century Dutch Calvinist and Reformed ministers
Dutch Calvinist and Reformed theologians
Dutch educators
Dutch political party founders
Members of the House of Representatives (Netherlands)
Chairmen of the Reformed Political Party
Leaders of the Reformed Political Party
People from Deventer
Reformed Political Party politicians
Dutch collaborators with Nazi Germany
20th-century Dutch journalists